Chewalla Creek is a stream in the U.S. state of Mississippi. It is a tributary to the Tippah River.

Chewalla Creek is a name derived from the Choctaw language meaning "cedar creek".

References

Rivers of Mississippi
Rivers of Marshall County, Mississippi
Mississippi placenames of Native American origin